Niklas Nørgaard Møller (born 31 May 1992) is a Danish professional golfer who plays on the European Tour.

Career
Møller was part of the Danish National Team and played in the 2014 Eisenhower Trophy in Japan. He appeared in the European Amateur Team Championship three times between 2013 and 2015, collecting a silver medal in 2015 at Halmstad Golf Club, after losing the final to Scotland.

Møller turned professional ahead of the 2016 season and joined the Nordic Golf League. In 2019 he topped the NGL Order of Merit and earned promotion to the Challenge Tour, after recording one victory and six runner-up finishes.

Møller enjoyed a solid 2021 season on the Challenge Tour with seven top-ten finishes, including fourth-place finishes at the D+D Real Czech Challenge and the Range Servant Challenge in Sweden. He earned promotion to the European Tour for 2022 after finishing 16th on the 2021 Challenge Tour's Road to Mallorca Rankings, following a performance at the Challenge Tour Grand Final that pushed him up from 21st position into the graduating ranks.

In his rookie season on the European Tour, Møller recorded top-10 finishes at the Porsche European Open, the Volvo Car Scandinavian Mixed and the Alfred Dunhill Links Championship, where he tied for 7th.

Amateur wins
2012 DGU Elite Tour Herrer II

Source:

Professional wins (3)

Nordic Golf League wins (3)

Source:

Team appearances
Amateur
European Amateur Team Championship (representing Denmark): 2013, 2014, 2015
Eisenhower Trophy (representing Denmark): 2014

Professional
European Championships (representing Denmark): 2018

See also
2021 Challenge Tour graduates

References

External links

Danish male golfers
European Tour golfers
Sportspeople from Copenhagen
1992 births
Living people